Feature detection or feature detectors may refer to:

 Feature detection (nervous system), a biological process for interpreting sensory input
 Orientation column, also known as a "feature detection column"
 Feature detection (computer vision), methods for finding parts of an image relevant to a computational task
 Feature detection (web development), determining whether a computing environment has specific functionality